Roughlee  is a village in Pendle, Lancashire, England, in the civil parish of Roughlee Booth. It is close to Nelson, Barrowford and Blacko. The village lies at the foot of Pendle Hill, well known for the Pendle Witches, and includes the hamlet of Crowtrees. The parish adjoins the Pendle parishes of Blacko, Barrowford, Old Laund Booth, Goldshaw Booth and Barley-with-Wheatley Booth. It is part of the Forest of Bowland Area of Outstanding Natural Beauty (AONB).

The village has won the small village category of the Lancashire Best Kept Village competition in 2006, and the champion village category in 2007. It was also runner-up in the champion category in 2009.

The village is featured in Joseph Delaney's 2008 novel The Spook's Battle.

According to the United Kingdom Census 2011, the parish has a population of 318, a decrease from 328 in the 2001 census.

Roughlee Booth was once a township in the ancient parish of Whalley. This became a civil parish in 1866, forming part of the Burnley Rural District from 1894 until 1974. The village of Newchurch in Pendle used to straddle the boundary with Goldshaw Booth, but that part of the parish was transferred in 1935.

Along with Higham-with-West Close Booth, Goldshaw Booth and Barley-with-Wheatley Booth, the parish forms the Higham with Pendleside ward of Pendle Borough Council.

Notable people 
 Alice Nutter (witch) was accused in Pendle and hanged as a witch in 1612 and now has a statue in the village.
 Bobby Elliott who was a drummer in the Hollies lives here.

See also

Listed buildings in Roughlee Booth

References
Notes

Citations

External links

  Roughlee Parish Council
 Visit Pendle - Roughlee
 British History Online - Roughlee Booth

Towns and villages in the Borough of Pendle
Forest of Bowland